The Venezuelan National Road Race Championships are held annually, and are governed by the Venezuelan Cycling Federation (in Spanish: Federación Venezolana de Ciclismo). The event also includes the Venezuelan National Time Trial Championships.

Multiple winners

Men

Elite

U23

Women

Elite

See also
 Vuelta a Venezuela
 Venezuelan National Time Trial Championships

References

National road cycling championships
National Road Race Championships
Recurring sporting events established in 1991
1991 establishments in Venezuela